Hämmerli is a formerly Swiss, now German manufacturer of air guns and firearms aimed mostly at target shooting, especially Olympic events governed by the International Shooting Sport Federation. In 2006, Hämmerli was acquired by Umarex; production and customer support moved to Ulm, Germany.

History
The Hämmerli brand dates back to 1863 when Johann Ulrich Hämmerli founded the company to make rifle barrels for the Swiss Army. Since then, Hämmerli has manufactured rifle barrels, firearms, and firearm components. In 1950, Hämmerli produced Olympic rifles that were used to win gold medals at the next four Olympics.

Pistols

Standard and centre-fire pistols
These pistols are used in 25 m Standard Pistol, 25 m Center-Fire Pistol (center-fire pistol) and 25 m Pistol (sport pistol) events.

208, 208s (discontinued), .22 LR
212 (discontinued), .22 LR, ″Jägerschaftspistole″, later modification of the 208
215 (discontinued), .22 LR, less luxurious version of 208
280 (discontinued), .22 LR or .32 S&W Long (Wadcutter)
SP20 (discontinued), .22 LR or .32 S&W Long
SP20 RRS, .22 LR or .32 S&W Long
Trailside, .22 LR, Formerly the SIG/Hämmerli Trailside and now the Hämmerli/X-Esse

Free pistol
Used to compete in the 50 m Pistol event for single-shot .22 LR
Hammerli 100/102/109 (discontinued), Martini–Henry type action used in event. Inspiration for the TOZ 35 free-pistol.
120 (discontinued)
150/152 (discontinued)
160/162 (discontinued)
FP10, (discontinued)
FP60, (discontinued, now manufactured by Walther)

Air pistol
Used to compete in .177 caliber 10 m Air Pistol events.
Hämmerli 480 series (480, 480k and 480k2), pre-charged-pneumatic (PCP) air pistol.
AP60, pre-charged-pneumatic (PCP) air pistol.

Rifles

300 m rifle
S 205, used in 300 m Rifle events and jointly developed with Sauer & Sohn

0.22 Long Rifle
TAC R1 22C .22 caliber tactical rimfire Rifle

Air rifle
AR20, .177 caliber pre-charged-pneumatic (PCP) Air rifle used to compete in 10 m Air Rifle events.

References

External links
Hämmerli Official Site
Hämmerli USA

Firearm manufacturers of Switzerland
Lüke & Ortmeier Gruppe